Brace is a surname. Notable people with the surname include:

 John Brace (MP) (born ), English Member of Parliament
 Adam Brace (born 1980), English playwright
 Andrew Brace (born 1988), former Belgian rugby union referee
 C. Loring Brace (born 1930), American professor of anthropology
 Charles Loring Brace (1826–1890), American philanthropist
 Danika Brace (born 1988), American football coach and former player
 David Onllwyn Brace (1848–1891), Welsh minister
 Deryn Brace (born 1975), Welsh former footballer
 DeWitt Bristol Brace (1859–1905), American physicist
 Donald Brace (1881–1955), American publisher
 Edward Brace (1770–1843), Rear Admiral of the British Royal Navy
 Ernest C. Brace (1931–2014), American former soldier, POW in Vietnam
 Gerald Warner Brace (1901–1978), American writer, educator, sailor and boat builder
 Henry Charles Brace, American politician
 Hilary Brace (born 1956), American artist
 Ivor Llewellyn Brace (died 1952), British colonial judge
 Jeffrey Brace (died 1827), born , a free African later captured and sold into slavery
 Joab Brace (1781–1861), American minister
 John Thurlow Brace (1685–?), British landowner and politician
 Jonathan Brace (1754–1837), United States Representative from Connecticut
 Julia Brace (1807–1884), deaf and blind woman who learned tactile American Sign Language
 Mike Brace (born 1950), paralympic skier, social worker, and leader of disabled charities
 Onllwyn Brace (1932–2013), Wales rugby union captain
 Peter Brace (1924–2018), British film actor and stunt performer
 Rick Brace, president of the CTV television network
 Robbie Brace (born 1964), English former footballer for Tottenham Hotspur
 Ron Brace (1986–2016), American NFL player
 Steve Brace (born 1961), Welsh former long-distance runner
 Stuart Brace (born 1942), English former footballer
 Thomas Kimberly Brace (1779–1860), American insurance executive and politician
 William Brace (1865–1947), British Member of Parliament and Under-Secretary of State for the Home Department
 William Francis Brace (1926–2012), American geophysicist
 Richard J. Brace (Died 1944), American fighter pilot during World War II, shot down and killed in Niece, France
 Richard J. Brace II (Born 1943), former VP of Pepsi Bottling Group

See also
 Brace (disambiguation)
 DJ Brace